Kuroń is a Polish surname. Notable people with the surname include:

 Danuta Kuroń (born 1949), Polish activist
 Jacek Kuroń (1934–2004), Polish politician, Danuta's husband
 Maciej Kuroń (1960–2008), Polish chef and journalist, Jacek's son

See also
 

Polish-language surnames